Debt adjustment is a form of debt relief that allows a government, organization, corporation, or individual to repay a debt over a longer period of time and with smaller payment amounts than the lender and borrower originally agreed upon. It is an alternative to bankruptcy. Debt settlement is a form of individual debt adjustment. 

In the United States, law firms point out that Chapter 13 Individual Debt Adjustment is much less expensive and complicated than Chapter 11 Reorganization.

References

External links
The Credit Docs
Commercial Debt Collection
Individual Debt Adjustment in the US, per Findlaw and US Courts

Adjustment